The 11th European Athletics Championships of 1974 were held from 2 September to 8 September in Italy, at Rome's Stadio Olimpico.  Contemporaneous reports on the event were given in the Glasgow Herald.

Men's results
Complete results were published.

Track
1969 |1971 |1974 |1978 |1982

Field
1969 |1971 |1974 |1978 |1982

Women's results

Track
1969 |1971 |1974 |1978 |1982

Field
1969 |1971 |1974 |1978 |1982

Medal table

Participation
According to an unofficial count, 747 athletes from 29 countries participated in the event, two athletes more than the official number of 745 as published.

 (5)
 (21)
 (25)
 (1)
 (46)
 (12)
 (71)
 (33)
 (44)
 (1)
 (12)
 (21)
 (2)
 (7)
 (48)
 (1)
 (2)
 (13)
 (14)
 (56)
 (4)
 (20)
 (83)
 (17)
 (33)
 (12)
 (68)
 (64)
 (11)

References 

 EAA
 Athletix

 
European Athletics Championships
European Athletics Championships
Sports competitions in Rome
European Athletics Championships
International athletics competitions hosted by Italy
Athletics Championships
European Athletics Championships
1970s in Rome
Athletics in Rome